Liangjiadian may refer to:

 Liangjiadian, Hebei, China
 Liangjiadian, Liaoning (亮甲店镇), town in Jinzhou District, Dalian, China